Cyperus glaucophyllus is a species of sedge that is endemic to eastern parts of Africa.

The species was first formally described by the botanist Johann Otto Boeckeler in 1888.

See also 
 List of Cyperus species

References 

glaucophyllus
Taxa named by Johann Otto Boeckeler
Plants described in 1888
Flora of Zambia
Flora of Uganda
Flora of Tanzania
Flora of South Africa
Flora of Swaziland
Flora of Sudan
Flora of Burundi
Flora of Kenya
Flora of Mozambique